The Birth of Saké is a 2015 documentary film about the Tedorigawa Brewery, a 144-year old sake brewery in Ishikawa Prefecture. The Birth of Saké documents the painstaking process of traditional, craft saké brewing that lasts throughout the winter.

Directed by Erik Shirai, a cinematographer for No Reservations, the film premiered at the Tribeca Film Festival, and also went on to win Best Documentary at the Bend Film Festival, Palm Springs International Film Festival, and the Ashland Film Festival.

A shortened 83 minute version of the film was broadcast September 5, 2016 on PBS POV (TV series) as Episode 6 of Season 29.

References

External links 
 
 
 PBS POV 2016 - The Birth of Saké

2015 films
American documentary films
Documentary films about wine
Sake
Documentary films about Japan
2010s English-language films
2010s American films